Marion Aye (April 5, 1903 – July 21, 1951) was an American actress of screen and stage who starred in several films during the 1920s, mostly comedies. She was sometimes credited as Maryon Aye.

Early life
Born in Chicago, Illinois, the daughter of attorney James H. Aye, she began her career at Balboa Studios in Long Beach. She was later "discovered" by producer Mack Sennett, who made her one of his Bathing Beauties.

Career

Aye was selected as one of the WAMPAS Baby Stars in 1922. She was a capable dancer, a talent she exhibited in several films. Aye was Larry Semon's leading lady in The Hick and worked with Stan Laurel in The Weak-End Party. She appeared in eighteen western shorts opposite Bob Reeves. When she signed a long-term film contract she became the first Hollywood star to agree to a morality clause. Her last film role was in the 1926 comedy Irene, starring Colleen Moore, although she continued to work in vaudeville.

In November 1927, Aye was one of six people arrested for their participation in presenting the play The Married Virgin at the Green Street Theater in San Francisco; the charge was that the play was immoral. The other five had been arrested on the charge once before, but it was Aye's first time.

Personal life
She married her first husband, Sherman William Plaskett, when she was a teenager. He died just seven months after their wedding when he contracted Spanish influenza. Her second husband was publicist Harry Wilson; they were married from 1920 until 1924. She married stage actor Ross Wilson Forrester on September 22, 1936.

Later years and death
Following retirement, she suffered depression from her isolation from the film industry. In 1935, she attempted suicide by swallowing poison. She continued to suffer from depression and on July 10, 1951, Aye was found in a "semi-conscious condition" after swallowing a handful of bi-chloride of mercury tablets in a motel room in Culver City, California. Her last words to her husband were: "I dropped one of the tablets on the floor and I'm afraid the dog will get it." She died eleven days later in a Los Angeles County hospital. Her father reported that she was despondent after failing to get a part in a television play. Her third husband, comedian Ross Forrester, was distraught, stating that he thought his wife was only joking about taking her life.

Filmography

References

External links

American silent film actresses
Actresses from Chicago
Drug-related suicides in California
1903 births
1951 suicides
20th-century American actresses
Burials at Forest Lawn Memorial Park (Glendale)
WAMPAS Baby Stars
Western (genre) film actresses
Vaudeville performers